Next Sunday is a collection of weekly essays by R. K. Narayan published in 1960. The book provides insights into Narayan's writings and perspectives and the protagonists of his works - the middle class common man. The book also includes his reflections on the themes of and actions in his novels and short stories.

References

Books by R. K. Narayan
1960 non-fiction books
Indian essay collections